A number of towns, sites, and churches in Italy and Italian-speaking areas are named after Saint Blaise, including:

 Monte San Biagio, Italian town, province of Latina, Lazio
 San Biagio, Venice, church in Venice, Italy
 San Biagio della Cima, Italian village, province of Imperia, Liguria
 San Biagio di Callalta, Italian town, province of Treviso, Veneto
 San Biagio, Montepulciano, church near Italian town of Montepulciano, province of Siena, Tuscany
 San Biagio Platani, Italian village, province of Agrigento, Sicily
 San Biagio Saracinisco, Italian village, province of Frosinone, Lazio
 San Biagio, Maranello, church in a town of Emilia-Romagna
 Church of San Biagio a Ravecchiai, in Bellinzona, Ticino, Switzerland 
 San Biagio della Pagnotta, a church in Rome 
 San Biagio, Modena, a Baroque church
 San Biagio, Pollenza, a neo-classical church 
 San Biagio, Lendinara, a neo-classical church in the Venetian 
 San Biagio, Montecatini Val di Cecina, a 14th-century church in Tuscany
 Abbazia di San Biagio di Piobbico, the ruins of an abbey in the Marche